Smriti Zubin Irani (née Malhotra;  born 23 March 1976) is an Indian politician and former actress, fashion model and producer. She is a Minister in Union Cabinet of India since May 2014, currently administrating the Ministries of Women and Child Development and also the first Non-Muslim to serve as the Minister of Minority Affairs. A prominent leader within the Bharatiya Janata Party, she is a Member of Parliament in the Lok Sabha, representing Amethi, Uttar Pradesh.

In the 2019 Indian general election, she defeated Rahul Gandhi — the country's principal opposition leader and the president of Indian National Congress —  to win the Amethi seat. Previously the Amethi constituency had been represented by the members of the Gandhi family for the last four decades. Earlier in 2011, Irani had become a member of the Rajya Sabha from Gujarat.

Irani was the youngest minister in the 2019 Council of Ministers, when she was sworn in as a Cabinet Minister in May 2019 at the age of 43. Having a diverse family background, Irani can speak in several Indian languages including Hindi, Bengali, Marathi, Gujarati, and Punjabi; as her paternal family has a Punjabi and Maharashtrian heritage, while her maternal family has a Bengali heritage.

Early and personal life
She was born as Smriti Malhotra, the daughter of a half-Punjabi, half-Maharashtrian Hindu father, Ajay Kumar Malhotra, and a Bengali Hindu mother, Shibani née Bagchi. She is the oldest of three sisters. She has been a part of the Rashtriya Swayamsevak Sangh (RSS) from childhood, her grandfather was an RSS swayamsevak and her mother was a member of Jana Sangh.

Smriti was educated at the Holy Child Auxilium School, New Delhi, which is run by Catholic nuns. Later, she enrolled in School of Open Learning at University of Delhi. In 2019, she revealed that she had written her first year B.Com. exams from that institution, but had not completed the three-year degree course.

In 2001, Smriti married a Parsi businessman, Zubin Irani. In October the same year, the couple had their first child, a son named Zohr. In September 2003, the couple had their second child, a daughter named Zoish. Smriti is also a stepmother to Shanelle who is Zubin Irani's daughter from his previous marriage to Mona Irani, a coordinator and former beauty contestant.

In 2018, responding to queries about her faith, she stated that she is a practicing Hindu married to a practicing Zoroastrian, and that wearing sindoor is her belief as a Hindu.

Acting career

Irani was one of the participants of the beauty pageant Miss India 1998 but couldn't reach the top 9, along with Gauri Pradhan Tejwani. In 1998, Irani appeared in a song "Boliyan" of the album "Saawan Mein Lag Gayi Aag" with Mika Singh. In 2000, she made her acting début with TV series Aatish and Hum Hain Kal Aaj Aur Kal, both of which aired on Star Plus. Apart from this, she acted in Kavita on DD metro. In mid-2000, Irani bagged the lead role of Tulsi Virani in Ekta Kapoor's production Kyunki Saas Bhi Kabhi Bahu Thi on Star Plus for which she holds the record of winning five consecutive ITA Award for Best Actress Popular and four Indian Telly Awards. Irani had a fallout with the producer Ekta Kapoor and she left the show in June 2007 and was replaced by Gautami Kapoor. She made her comeback in May 2008 in a special episode, reconciling with Kapoor.

In 2002, she played the epic character Sita in Zee TV's Ramayan along with Nitish Bharadwaj In 2006, Irani co-produced the show Thodi Si Zameen Thoda Sa Aasmaan under her banner Ugraya Entertainment and co-produced by Balaji Telefilms. She also played the lead role of Uma in it. In 2007, she produced the TV serial Virrudh for Sony TV and also portrayed the lead character of Vasudha in it. She produced Mere Apne for 9X and portrayed the protagonist alongside Vinod Khanna. She acted in a supporting role in Zee TV's Teen Bahuraaniyaan.

In 2008, Irani along with Sakshi Tanwar hosted the show Yeh Hai Jalwa, a dance based reality show featuring celebrities along with their troops on 9X. In the same year she produced another show on Zee TV, Waaris which ended in 2009. In 2009, she appeared in a comedy show Maniben.com, aired on SAB TV. She also co-produced the show in collaboration with Contiloe Entertainment. In 2012, she worked in Bengali movie Amrita.

Political career

Irani joined the Bharatiya Janata Party in 2003. The following year, she was appointed vice-president of the Maharashtra Youth Wing in 2004. In the general elections held that year for the 14th Lok Sabha, she contested unsuccessfully against Kapil Sibal from the Chandni Chowk constituency in Delhi. That election witnessed a shock defeat for the incumbent Vajpayee government. In December 2004, Irani, blaming then Gujarat Chief Minister, Narendra Modi for BJP's electoral losses, threatened to fast unto death until he resigned. She retracted this demand after the BJP's central leadership threatened to take action against her.

Irani was nominated as executive member of the central committee of the BJP. During the campaign for the 2009 parliamentary elections, while campaigning for Vijay Goel in the New Delhi constituency, Irani voiced her concern for women's safety in the city and advocated capital punishment for rapists as a deterrent. In early 2010, Irani was appointed National Secretary of BJP and on 24 June, she was appointed All India President of the BJP's women's wing, BJP Mahila Morcha. As National President of BJP Women's Wing, she successfully pursued Permanent Commission for Women in the Indian Army by facilitating legal aid to women officers who held temporary commission and were agitating for permanent commission.

In August 2011, Irani finally entered parliament. She was sworn in as a member of parliament from Gujarat to the Rajya Sabha.

Irani contested the 2014 general elections against Rahul Gandhi in Amethi constituency of Uttar Pradesh. Irani lost to Gandhi by 1,07,923 votes, a 12.32% margin. On 26 May 2014, Prime Minister Narendra Modi appointed her as the Minister of Human Resource Development in his cabinet. Her appointment was criticised by many people owing to her lack of formal higher education.

Irani has been accused of misrepresenting her educational qualifications. Conflicting affidavits were allegedly submitted by her while filing for different elections. In June 2015, a lower court held that the allegations against Irani were maintainable and a delay in prosecution was not a valid reason for dismissal. Irani asked people to file a PIL about her educational qualification to know about the truth behind the affidavit controversy.

Irani implemented various reforms in universities during her term as HRD minister. Irani made a speech in Parliament in which she discussed the 2016 JNU sedition controversy and the Suicide of Rohith Vemula. University of Hyderabad doctor Rajashree M contradicted some claims made by Irani regarding the circumstances of Rohith's death.

She announced to start new yoga departments in six new universities in June 2016.

In July 2016, in a cabinet reshuffle Irani was shuffled to the Ministry of Textiles from MHRD.

In July 2017, she was handed the additional charge of Ministry of Information and Broadcasting (India) when former Minister Venkaiah Naidu resigned from the ministry to take part in vice-presidential elections.

In 2019, Irani became a Member of Parliament for Amethi constituency after winning the Lok Sabha seat in the 2019 general elections from Rahul Gandhi.

Work undertaken as Union Minister
Smriti Irani is currently the youngest minister in the cabinet of Narendra Modi. She is also the first woman to hold office as the Union Minister for Human Resource Development and Union Minister of Textiles. She is also the youngest woman to be nominated to the Rajya Sabha. Some of her key achievements in various portfolios held by her have been listed below :

As Union Minister for Human Resource Development (May 2014–July 2016)

In her term as the HRD minister, Irani undertook a number of decisions which helped in improving the quality, inclusivity and outcome of education in the country. Some of the key achievements have been listed as under :

 The Global Initiative of Academic Networks (GIAN) was launched by the Minister post the retreat of IITs in 2014. The network is an initiative within the Higher Education sector aimed at tapping the talent pool of scientists and entrepreneurs, internationally to encourage their engagement with the institutes of Higher Education in India so as to augment the country's existing academic resources, accelerate the pace of quality reform, and elevate India's scientific and technological capacity to global excellence.
 Udaan Yojana and Pragati Scheme launched in 2014 by Irani aims to address the low enrolment of girls in engineering colleges. The scheme has been designed to provide a comprehensive platform to deserving girl students who aspire to pursue higher education in engineering and assist them in preparing for the IIT-JEE while studying in Classes XI and XII. By 2016, 143 of the 300 girls under the scheme had cleared JEE. In the same year the Pragati Scheme was launched in order to provide financial support and encouragement to female students to pursue technical education.
 Know Your College Portal was launched in the year 2014 for helping a prospective student make a value judgement with regard to the selection of an appropriate college for pursuing higher education by providing the necessary information about the college.
 The IMPacting Research INnovation and Technology (IMPRINT) India Scheme, brainchild of Irani was launched by the former President, Pranab Mukherjee and Prime Minister Narendra Modi in 2015. It is the first of its kind MHRD supported Pan-IIT + IISc joint initiative to address the major science and engineering challenges that India must address and champion to enable, empower and embolden the nation for inclusive growth and self-reliance. Within a year of its launch 31 ministries and government departments have proposed to co-fund 229 research projects worth Rs 59,589 lakh at IITs and other premier Indian research institutes.
 National institute Ranking Framework is an indigenous ranking framework for higher educational institutions launched by Irani in 2015, It will now allow the students seeking admission into colleges to assess the performance and quality level of different colleges.
 SWAYAM (Study Webs of Active Learning for Young Aspiring Minds), launched in the year 2016 by Irani is a Massive Open Online Courses (MOOCS) platform, which aims at providing online courses, study material and course registration. It has been designed to achieve the three cardinal principles of Education Policy viz., access, equity and quality. It further aims to bridge the digital divide for students who have hitherto remained untouched by the digital revolution and have not been able to join the mainstream of the knowledge economy.
 Veer Gatha series was launched by the HRD ministry under the leadership of Irani in the year 2016 as an initiative to take the stories of India's bravest of the brave soldiers to young school children and inspire them.

Union Minister for Textiles (July 2016–July 2021)

In July 2016, Irani was given charge of the Textiles Ministry, taking over from Santosh Kumar Gangwar. She held that portfolio for a full five years, until July 2021, having been re-appointed to the position after the parliamentary elections of 2019. Her contribution to the sector has been appreciated by various industry bodies like the textile council TEXPROCIL, the Clothing Manufacturers Association of India and the Indian Texpreneurs Federation (ITF). Her significant initiatives as Minister of Textiles include:

 Apparel Sector Special Package launched in the year 2018, is a Rs. 6,000 crore worth of package launched by Irani in 2016, aimed at strengthening the entire textile industry by providing financial support to small scale players in the industry. 
 Support for Technical Textile, in a bid to fulfil the long-standing demand of the industry, in January 2019, Irani declare technical textile items as a separate category and declared that the government had notified 207 HSN codes as technical textiles. The said move is expected to benefit 900 million farmers in the country and will help the industry to grow over Rs 2 trillion (short scale) in the tech textile sector and help the potential investors to enter into technical textiles.
 Special focus on the North Eastern Regions, during the first term of her tenure as the Minister of Textiles, 21 readymade garment manufacturing units in the north eastern region had been made functional. Special initiatives were taken to further push sericulture in the region, for which Rs. 690 crore had been earmarked.
 Silk Samagra Workshop was launched by Irani in 2018, which is an Integrated Scheme for Development of Silk Industry for 3 years from 2017 to 2020. The main objective of the scheme is to maintain Breeders stock, Breed improvement through R&D Projects, Development of mechanised practices, Technology translation through Sericulture Information Linkages and Knowledge System (SILKS) Portal, Mobile Application for Stakeholders and for seed quality monitoring.
 Samarth Scheme, is an aspirational initiative launched by Irani in her second term as the Union Minister for Textiles. The ministry has envisaged an expenditure of over Rs. 1,300 crore to upskill over 4 lakh workers in 16 states.

Union Minister for Information and Broadcasting (July 2017–May 2018)

 The 48th edition of the International Film Festival of India (IFFI) was held under her watch in November 2017. For the first time, under the Accessible India Campaign of the Government of India, cinematic works were presented in audio-described format for the visually impaired. Film star Shah Rukh Khan expressed his admiration in these words: "Great endeavour by I&B Minister Smriti Irani to make IFFI the most inclusive, relevant forum for Indian cinema. My unwavering support to you". The event was a star studded one, with Sridevi, AR Rahman, Shahid Kapoor and Vishal Bhardwaj and many other stars registering their presence at the event.
 In FY 2017, during Mrs. Irani's term as I&B Minister, the revenue of State-run broadcaster Doordarshan rose to Rs 827.51 crore, surpassing its target of Rs 800 crore.

Union Minister for Women and Child Developments (May 2019–present)

In the second term of the Modi Government, Irani was appointed given the key portfolio Union Minister for Women and Child Development. Subsequently in the cabinet re-shuffle of July 2021, Irani was again given the charge of the Ministry of Women and Child Development.

 Committee on Gender Budgeting, within first few weeks of taking charge as the Minister for Women and Child Development, Irani acknowledged the role of Gender Budgeting in the progression of a women-friendly nation and proactively engaged with various stakeholders in order to give recommendations for immediate actionables to the Prime Minister's office with reference to Gender Budgeting for Budget, 2019–2020.
 Amendment to the Protection of Children from Sexual Offences (POCSO) Act, 2019: One of her first legislative initiatives as the Minister for WCD was the said amendment, which aims to make punishment more stringent and even include death penalty for offenders involved in sexual crimes against minors. Further, through the said amendment, the minster also undertook the initiative to define "child pornography" and reiterated a "zero tolerance" stance against the crime.
 Bharatiya Poshan Krishi Kosh, As part of the Poshan Abhiyaan, Irani along with Bill Gates, through his foundation, announced the launch of India's first Poshan Atlas, Bhartiya Poshan Krishi Kosh(BPKK) in order to create a repository of diverse crops across 127 agro-climatic zones of the country.

MP from Amethi 

Irani, in 2019 general elections, in Amethi constituency of Uttar Pradesh, won a historic victory against Rahul Gandhi, President of the Indian National Congress, by a margin of 55,120 votes. The Bharatiya Janata Party (BJP) and its leadership put in an all around effort over the past five years to ensure this win. Irani made multiple visits to Amethi after her loss to launch central development schemes in the constituency, to underscore her message that she would provide better representation than the incumbent member. Congress suffered from the assumption that the family loyalty factor would continue to hold the seat for the political dynasty, Irani stressed how a record number of toilets and houses had been built by the Centre for the poor in Amethi since the Modi government came to power.

This seat had previously been held by Rahul Gandhi since 2004.

Post her victory from Amethi and entry into the Lok Sabha :

 She has been allotted a first-row seat in the Lok Sabha, signaling her ascent in the BJP hierarchy.
 Smriti Irani lends a shoulder to mortal remains of a close aide who was shot dead in Amethi.
 After winning the election she launched "Didi Apke Dwar" program, a block-wise Janta Darbar for listening to and solving public grievances.
 She fulfilled her election promise of Kendriya Vidyalaya for Amethi within first 3-month of winning the seat.

Awards and international conferences 

 Young Global Leader, Irani was named Young Global Leader from India by the World Economic Forum (WEF) in 2015. The said award in the past has been given to leaders like British Prime Minister David Cameron, Alibaba Group chief Jack Ma, Yahoo CEO Marissa Mayer, Google chief Larry Page, Italian Prime Minister Matteo Renzi.
 Irani was unanimously elected as a Member representing the Asia Pacific Region to the Task Force responsible for establishing the 1st ever Committee for Young Parliamentarians in the 126th Assembly of the Inter-Parliamentary Union.
 Irani was also the USAID Goodwill Ambassador to India for WHO-ORS program for 3 Years.
 Irani in 2019 was name was listed in Femina's Power List under the theme "Women Who Changed The Game" for her victory of Amethi over congress President Rahul Gandhi.

Controversies

Undergraduate degree controversy 
Irani was accused of providing contradictory affidavits about her educational qualifications during different elections. In her affidavit for the 2004 Lok Sabha elections, she reportedly stated her educational qualification as B.A. from Delhi University. However, while filing affidavits in her nomination papers for Rajya Sabha from Gujarat in 2011 and Lok Sabha from Uttar Pradesh in 2014, she said her highest educational qualification was, B.com, Part 1 from School of Open Learning at University of Delhi.

She later claimed that she has done B.com, Part 1 from Delhi University (not completing the full course till Part 3) in the affidavit she filed for Rajya Sabha elections from Gujarat in 2017 which stated "Bachelor of Commerce, Part 1. Three year degree course not completed".

A freelance writer Ahmer Khan filed a complaint in April 2015 that Smriti Irani had filed an affidavit in April 2004 for the Lok Sabha elections, stating that she had completed her Bachelor of Arts in 1996 from School of Correspondence (Delhi University) but in another affidavit of 16 April 2014, filed by her for the Lok Sabha polls, it was said that she was a Bachelor of Commerce Part-I from the School of Open Learning (Delhi University). The plea said that the facts and circumstances reveal commission of offences by Smriti under section 125A (which deals with penalty of filing false affidavit and entails a jail term) of the Representation of People Act, 1951. 

The court had on 20 November 2016 allowed the complainant's plea seeking direction to the officials of EC and DU to bring the records of Ms. Irani's qualifications after he said he was unable to place them before the court. During the hearings of the complaint, the court was told by a poll panel official that the documents filed by Ms. Irani regarding her educational qualification while filing nominations were not traceable. Also, in pursuance of the court's earlier direction, Delhi University had also submitted that the documents pertaining to Ms. Irani's BA course in 1996, as purportedly mentioned by her in an affidavit filed during 2004 Lok Sabha elections, were yet to be found.

On 18 October 2016, a Delhi court said that Smriti Irani will not be summoned for the fake degree case because the petition filed against Irani questioning her college degrees was an attempt to harass her. The court said that the complainant may not have filed it if she were not a central minister. Metropolitan Magistrate Harvinder Singh said that original evidence had already been lost due to the passage of years, secondary evidence wasn't enough for court. The Magistrate also said that the complainant made a "delay of 11 years" in filing the complaint against Irani. This verdict of the lower court was challenged in the Delhi High Court and the court asked all the records of the case to be handed over to it in order to examine case records before deciding to summon Irani or anyone else.

Yale University degree row 
As an incumbent minister for human resource and development of India, at the 2014 India Today Women Summit, Irani stated, "I do have a degree from Yale as well, which I can bring out and show how Yale celebrated my leadership capacity." The degree which Irani was mentioning turned out to be a certificate from Yale faculty for attending a 6-day training program at the university.

Trivialising Child Abuse
In December 2021, while at the same time holding a portfolio of Union Women and Child Development Minister Smriti Irani posted an image on Instagram which read, "When I was a kid, they didn't take me to a psychologist... My mom was able to open my chakra, stabilize my karma and clean my aura with one single slap." She was widely criticized for trivializing the widely prevalent issue of child abuse in Indian households with her post and degrading the role of mental health experts.

Silly Souls Cafe Controversy
In July 2022, a website by the name of Herald Goa published a story on an RTI response received by lawyer Aires Rodrigues alleging that the liquor license of Silly Souls Cafe and Bar had been renewed illegally and that Smriti Irani's family is connected with the bar. In an earlier interview on a food critic's YouTube channel, Smriti Irani's daughter agreed that the bar is owned by her. In an affidavit in Delhi High Court, Smriti Irani denied any connection of her family with the bar. Later an RTI reply revealed that the license was issued in the name of a company linked with Irani's family. Earlier RTI filings show that the Irani family's company and the bar has the same address and identical GST number, and that the Irani family's company's operation includes liquor sales, which requires license according to law.

Electoral history
 2004 – Lost election against Kapil Sibal of Congress from Chandni Chowk, New Delhi
 2014 – Lost against Rahul Gandhi from Amethi (Lok Sabha constituency)
 2019 – present – Won against Rahul Gandhi from Amethi (Lok Sabha constituency)

Works and appearances

Television

Theatre projects

Films

Books 
Smriti Irani's debut novel is Lal Salaam, published by Westland publishers in 2021. It is inspired by the April 2010 Maoist attack in Dantewada and the role of the central police forces in insurgencies.

Awards

References

External links

 Detailed Profile: Smt. Smriti Zubin Irani
 

1976 births
Living people
Rajya Sabha members from Gujarat
Indian soap opera actresses
Indian television actresses
Indian women television producers
Indian television producers
Indian actor-politicians
Actresses in Bengali cinema
Actors from Mumbai
Indian Hindus
Bengali politicians
Punjabi people
National Democratic Alliance candidates in the 2014 Indian general election
Rashtriya Swayamsevak Sangh members
People who fabricated academic degrees
Women in Gujarat politics
Narendra Modi ministry
21st-century Indian women politicians
21st-century Indian politicians
Bharatiya Janata Party politicians from Gujarat
Women members of the Rajya Sabha
Women television producers
India MPs 2019–present
National Democratic Alliance candidates in the 2019 Indian general election
Education Ministers of India
Ministers for Information and Broadcasting of India
Ministers of Minority Affairs
Members of the Cabinet of India
Rajya Sabha members from the Bharatiya Janata Party
Women members of the Lok Sabha
Women members of the Cabinet of India